Mark Jacobsen (born 1968) is an Australian international lawn and indoor bowler.

Bowls career
In the 2000 World Outdoor Bowls Championship he won a bronze medal in the pairs with Brett Duprez.

He also won a gold medal in the pairs with Brett Duprez at the 1998 Commonwealth Games in Kuala Lumpur.

He won five medals at the Asia Pacific Bowls Championships, of which four have been gold medals.

References

1968 births
Australian male bowls players
Living people
Commonwealth Games medallists in lawn bowls
Commonwealth Games gold medallists for Australia
Bowls players at the 1998 Commonwealth Games
20th-century Australian people
Sportsmen from Victoria (Australia)
Sportspeople from Melbourne
Medallists at the 1998 Commonwealth Games